Jane Elliott or Jane Elliot may refer to:

 Jane Elliott (character) aka Jane Eyre, a fictional character in a 1847 novel by Charlotte Brontë
 Jane Elliott (sociologist) (born 1966), professor of social research
 Jane Elliott (born 1933), American educator
 Jane Elliot (born 1947), American actress
 Jane Elliott (choreographer)
 Jean Elliot (1727–1805) Scottish poet, also known as Jane Elliot
 Jane Evans Elliot (1820–1886), American Civil War memoirists

See also
 Elliot
 Patricia Leitch (1933–2015), British children's author who also used the pseudonym Jane Eliot